The Birmingham Stechford by-election, in Birmingham, on 31 March 1977 was held after Labour Member of Parliament (MP) Roy Jenkins resigned his seat following his appointment as President of the European Commission. A seat that had been solidly Labour since its formation in 1950, it was won by Andrew MacKay of the Conservative Party, before being regained by Labour in 1979. The by-election was noted for the strong performance of the National Front candidate and the presence of two far left candidates.

Background
As a leading Labour sitting MP Roy Jenkins had hoped to become Foreign Secretary in the government of James Callaghan but was overlooked in favour of Anthony Crosland. Following this Jenkins was nominated as President of the European Commission in succession to François-Xavier Ortoli, a move which necessitated his departure from Parliament.

Candidates
With the seat being solid Labour Party territory the by-election presented the possibility of a return to Parliament for Terry Davis, who had served as member for the defunct Bromsgrove seat from a by-election in 1971 until its abolition in 1974. Davis however failed to take the seat and began a pattern for the ailing Labour government who also lost the next by-election in Ashfield when David Marquand followed Jenkins to a role in the Commission.

It also left the governing Labour Party without a majority and resulted in a vote of no confidence being issued, although the government won and was able to cling onto power by forming a pact with the Liberals.

The Conservative candidate Andrew MacKay won the election with a majority of nearly 2000, although ultimately he would only hold the seat until 1979 when it was regained for Labour. MacKay would go on to enjoy a long parliamentary career representing a number of constituencies.

The Liberal Party candidate was Graham Gopsill, a Birmingham councillor who finished the by-election in a lowly fourth place. Gopsill would later serve the Liberal Democrats in Droitwich Spa until his death in 2009. He was beaten into fourth by National Front candidate Andrew Brons, a veteran of a number of far right movements and member of the NF National Directorate who eventually became NF chairman in 1980. Other candidates to appear on the ballot were leftists Brian Heron of the International Marxist Group and journalist Paul Foot for the Socialist Workers Party.

Results

References

1977 elections in the United Kingdom
Stretchford, 1977
1977 in England
1970s in Birmingham, West Midlands